White power music is music that promotes white nationalism. It encompasses various music styles, including rock, country, and folk. Ethnomusicologist Benjamin R. Teitelbaum argues that white power music "can be defined by lyrics that demonize variously conceived non-whites and advocate racial pride and solidarity. Most often, however, insiders conceptualized white power music as the combination of those themes with pounding rhythms and a charging punk or metal-based accompaniment." Genres include Nazi punk, Rock Against Communism, National Socialist black metal, and fashwave.

Barbara Perry writes that contemporary white supremacist groups include "subcultural factions that are largely organized around the promotion and distribution of racist music." According to the Human Rights and Equal Opportunity Commission "racist music is principally derived from the far-right skinhead movement and, through the Internet, this music has become perhaps the most important tool of the international neo-Nazi movement to gain revenue and new recruits."  An article in Popular Music and Society says "musicians believe not only that music could be a successful vehicle for their specific ideology but that it also could advance the movement by framing it in a positive manner."

Dominic J. Pulera writes that the music is more pervasive in some countries in Europe than it is in the United States, despite some European countries banning or curtailing its distribution. European governments regularly deport "extremist aliens", ban white power bands and raid organizations that produce and distribute the music. In the United States, racist music is protected freedom of speech in the United States by the First Amendment to the U.S. Constitution.

White power country music
Several subgenres of white power music have been spawned, including country music — also referred to as segregationist music — which was developed in response to the American civil rights movement. The songs expressed resistance to the federal government and civil rights advocates who were challenging well-established white supremacist practices which were endemic in the  American South. During the 1940s and 1950s, changes also occurred in the music recording industry that allowed regional recording companies to form across the United States, addressing small specialized markets. B.C. Malone writes: "the struggles waged by black Americans to attain economic dignity and racial justice provided one of the ugliest chapters in country music history, an outpouring of racist records on small labels, mostly from Crowley, Louisiana, which lauded the Ku Klux Klan and attacked African-Americans in the most vicious of stereotypical terms."

The artists often adopted pseudonyms, and some of their music was "highly confrontational, making explicit use of racial epithets, stereotypes and threats of violence against civil rights activists. Much of the music "featured blatantly racist stereotypes that dehumanized African Americans", equating them with animals or "using cartoonish imagery associated with "Jigaboos"". Lyrics warned of white violence on African Americans if they insisted on being treated as equals. Other songs were more subtle, couching racist messages behind social critiques and political action calls. The lyrics, in the tradition of right-wing populism, questioned the legitimacy of the federal government and rallied whites to protect "Southern rights" and traditions. The song "Black Power" includes the lyrics:

Reb Rebel Records
In 1966, businessman Jay "J.D." Miller created a niche record label for his company, the defiantly segregationist Reb Rebel Records. It was arguably the most notable of the racist country music record labels. Reb Rebel released 21 singles and For Segregationists Only, an album of its ten  bestselling songs, four of which were Johnny Rebel's. The label's first single, "Dear Mr. President" (referring to then-president Lyndon B. Johnson), by Happy Fats (Leroy Leblanc), sold more than 200,000 copies. The song parodied Johnson's Great Society programs, which aimed to eliminate poverty and racial injustice. Other songs were primarily about civil rights or the Vietnam War, "but they never really attacked black people." The studio's second release, "Flight NAACP 105" by "the Son of Mississippi" (Joe Norris), was the label's bestseller; the track was a "spontaneous skit in the vein of Amos 'n' Andy." It was the first in a series of "highly racist take-offs" of Amos n' Andy. Few of Miller's racist records were played on the radio in Louisiana.

Johnny Rebel
Johnny Rebel, the pseudonym that Cajun country musician Clifford Joseph Trahane used on racist recordings issued in the 1960s, became the "forefather of white power music." Johnny Rebel's six singles (12 songs altogether), frequently use the racial epithet nigger, and often voiced sympathy for racial segregation and the Ku Klux Klan (KKK), such as his first B-side "Kajun Ku Klux Klan", which was a "cautionary tale centered on the story of 'Levi Coon' who dared to demand that he be served in a café." The songs were "vehemently anti-black, its pro-segregationist lyrics set to the twangs of the era's swampbilly craze."

Because of bootlegged records and Internet interest, Johnny Rebel's career continued; in the late 1990s he was rediscovered, and he re-released his music on CD and promoted it with his own website. The site, however, did not spark new interest outside his fanbase until September 11 attacks of 2001. Johnny Rebel recorded and released "Infidel Anthem", about "the whipping America should lay on Osama bin Laden," leading to an appearance on The Howard Stern Show, where his new compilation CD and the new song were promoted. At the time, Stern's show had a peak audience of around 20 million.

Michael Wade argues that Johnny Rebel "influenced British racist musicians, notably the band Skrewdriver, which inspired other right-wing musicians".

White power rock
Nazi punk music is stylistically similar to most forms of punk rock, although it differs by having lyrics that express hatred of Jews, homosexuals, communists, anarchists, anti-racists and people who are not considered white, as opposed to the often left-wing lyrics of punk rock. In 1978 in Britain, the white nationalist National Front (NF) had a punk-oriented youth organization called the Punk Front. Although the Punk Front only lasted one year, it included a number of white power punk bands such as The Dentists, The Ventz, Tragic Minds and White Boss. The Nazi punk subculture appeared in the United States by the early 1980s during the rise of the hardcore punk scene.

The Rock Against Communism movement originated in the British punk scene in late 1978 with activists associated with the NF. The most notable RAC band was Skrewdriver, which started out as a non-political punk band but evolved into a white power skinhead band after the original lineup broke up and a new lineup was formed. They were the "most dominant white racial extremist band" and were idealized in the "emerging movement that arose in response to perceptions of political liberalism, diversity, and the loss of a power in the white community." Skrewdriver advocated on behalf of extreme right-wing and racist politics, and its frontman Ian Stuart Donaldson identified himself as a neo-Nazi. The group performed mainly for other white power skinheads and "asserted the need for extremist political violence." Bands that followed their lead also "fused racist ideology, heavy metal and hard rock styles", embracing "aggressive racism and ethnic nationalism".

National Socialist black metal (NSBM) is black metal that promotes National Socialist (Nazi) beliefs through their lyrics and imagery. These beliefs often include: white supremacy, racial separatism, antisemitism, heterosexism, and Nazi interpretations of paganism or Satanism (Nazi mysticism). According to Mattias Gardell, NSBM musicians see "national socialism as a logical extension of the political and spiritual dissidence inherent in black metal. Bands whose members hold Nazi beliefs but do not express these through their lyrics are generally not considered NSBM by black metal musicians, but are labelled as such in media reports. Some black metal bands have made references to Nazi Germany purely for shock value, much like some punk rock and heavy metal bands. According to Christian Dornbusch and Hans-Peter Killguss, völkisch pagan metal and neo-Nazism are the current trends in the black metal scene, and are affecting the broader metal scene. Mattias Gardell, however, sees NSBM artists as a minority within black metal.

See also
 George Burdi
 Coon song
 "Das Judenthum in der Musik" ("Jewishness in Music") – an essay by the German composer Richard Wagner
 Far-right politics
 Far-right subcultures
 Landser (band)
 List of Fascist movements
 List of Ku Klux Klan organizations
 List of National Socialist black metal bands
 List of neo-Nazi bands
 List of neo-Nazi organizations
 List of organizations designated by the Southern Poverty Law Center as hate groups#Neo-Nazi
 List of white nationalist organizations
 Louis and the Nazis - a 2003 documentary about American neo-Nazis which was produced and hosted by Louis Theroux
Prussian Blue (duo)
 Johnny Rebel (singer)
Resistance Records
Westboro Baptist Church music parodies - homophobic (and occasionally antisemitic and anti-Catholic) songs by the Westboro Baptist Church which are also considered hate music.
 Radical right (Europe)
 Radical right (United States)
 Right-wing populism
 Right-wing terrorism
 Terrorism in the United States
 Domestic terrorism in the United States

References

Bibliography
 Apel, W. (1969). Harvard Dictionary of Music, Cambridge, MA, Harvard University Press.
 Brake, M. (1980). The Sociology of Youth Culture and Youth Subcultures, Sex and Drugs and Rock 'n' Roll?, London, Routledge & Kegan Paul.
 
 
 Grout, D.J. (1960). A History of Western Music, New York; W.W. Norton & Co.
 Hebdige, Dick. (1979). Subculture: The Meaning of Style; London, Methuen; Fletcher & Son ltd, 1979..
 Johnny Rebel – Klassic Klan Kompositions. (2003). Retrieved February 1, 2006.
 
 Lawler, J. (1996). Songs of life: The meaning of country music. Nashville, TN: Pogo Press.
  Leroy "Happy Fats" LaBlanc. (no date). Cajun French Music Association. Retrieved June 17, 2006.
 Mackay, J. (1993). Populist ideology and country music. In G. H. Lewis (Ed.), All that Glitters: Country Music in America (pp. 285–304). Bowling Green, OH: Bowling Green State University Popular Press.
 Malone, B. C. (2002a). Country Music, U.S.A. (2 nd ed,). Austin, TX: University of Texas Press.
 Malone, B. C. (2002b). Don't Get Above Your Raisin': Country Music and the Southern Working Class. Chicago, IL: University of Illinois Press.
 
 Pittman, N. (2003). Johnny Rebel Speaks. Retrieved February 1, 2006, from "Present at the Creation." (2001, Fall). Southern Poverty Law Center Intelligence Report. Accessed November 1, 2006.
 Sample, T. (1996). White soul: Country music, the church, and working Americans. Nashville, TN: Abingdon Press.

Further reading
 Shekhovtsov, Anton, and Jackson, Paul (eds) (2012), White Power Music: Scenes of Extreme-Right Cultural Resistance. Ilford: Searchlight and RNM Publications.
 
 Hill, Jane H. (2008). The Everyday Language of White Racism. Malden, MA: Wiley-Blackwell.
 

20th century in music
Music by ethnicity
Music history
Musicology
Neo-Nazi music
Political communication
Social history of the United States
White supremacy in the United States
Anti-Chinese sentiment in the United States